The UEFA European Under-18 Championship 1967 Final Tournament was held in Turkey.

Qualification

|}

Teams
The following teams entered the tournament. Seven teams qualified (Q) and nine teams entered without playing qualification matches.

 
 
  (Q)
 
  (Q)
  (Q)
  (Q)
  (Q)
 
 
 
 
  (Q)
 
  (host)
  (Q)

Group stage

Group A

Group B

Group C

Group D

Semifinals

Third place match

Final

External links
Results by RSSSF

UEFA European Under-19 Championship
Under-18
Under-18
1967
May 1967 sports events in Europe
Sport in Istanbul
1967 in youth association football
1960s in Istanbul